The following is a list of compositions by the Italian Baroque composer Antonio Vivaldi (1678–1741).

Works with opus number
The following is a list of compositions by Vivaldi that were published during his lifetime and assigned an opus number. The more comprehensive RV numbering scheme was created in the 1970s.

Fictitious Opus 13
An alleged "Opus 13", Il pastor fido (The Faithful Shepherd) was published in 1737 by Jean-Noël Marchand through a secret agreement with Nicolas Chédeville to publish a collection of Chédeville's compositions under Vivaldi's name. Chédeville supplied the funding and received the profits, all of which was documented in a notarial act by Marchand in 1749. The work includes six sonatas for musette, Vielle à roue, recorder, flute, oboe or violin, and basso continuo.

Works by RV number
Most of Vivaldi's works do not have an opus number and so they are referred to by a catalog number such as the Ryom-Verzeichnis number.

Concertos, sinfonias, sonatas

Operas

Sacred music

A possible setting, or even settings (considering the many settings of other liturgical text Vivaldi composed) of the Miserere may have existed, as hinted by the two introductory sets of movements intended for the piece(s), but such composition(s) have been lost.

Cantatas

Serenatas and other large vocal works

References

External links

Antonio Vivaldi – Instrumental Works Cross-Reference: A reference guide, cross-listing works by Ryom [RV], Fanna [F], Pincherle [P], Ricordi, and Opus numbers, as well as providing several other helpful lists of Vivaldi's works.
Catalogue of Vivaldi's works, 
RV catalogue 
Compositions by Antonio Vivaldi at AllMusic
Lost Vivaldi flute concerto found in Edinburgh archive

 
Vivaldi